Melville Castle is a three-storey Gothic castellated mansion situated less than a mile (2 km) west-south-west of Dalkeith, Midlothian, near the North Esk.

History

An earlier tower house on the site was demolished when the present structure, designed in 1786–1791 by James Playfair for Henry Dundas, 1st Viscount Melville, was built.

The original tower house was owned by the Melville family, before passing to Sir John Ross in the 14th century. It subsequently changed hands with the attached lands several times and was sold to David Rannie in 1705. It then passed to Henry Dundas through his marriage to the daughter of David Rannie, Elizabeth Rannie.

The Castle was owned by the Dundas family until after the Second World War, when the ninth Lord Melville moved to a smaller house on the estate and the castle was leased as an army rehabilitation centre and then later as a hotel.  By the early 1980s, the hotel fell into disrepair and was unoccupied.  In the late 1980s, the estate and the adjoining farms were sold, but remained closed.

In 1993, the castle was bought by the Hay Trust, which extensively restored the property over 8 years. The castle was reopened as a hotel in June 2003, leased by Aurora Hotels.  Their lease expired in January 2012. Today it still operates as a hotel and venue for weddings and continues in the ownership of the Hay Trust.

In 2020, during the Coronavirus pandemic the hotel temporary closed and was later opened back up in 2021 having been leased out to the original collection.

See also
List of castles in Scotland
 - an East Indiaman launched in 1786 and wrecked with great loss of life in 1802.

References

External links
Melville Castle website

Country houses in Midlothian
Castles in Midlothian
Category A listed buildings in Midlothian
Listed castles in Scotland
Inventory of Gardens and Designed Landscapes
Dalkeith
Bonnyrigg and Lasswade
Melville family